After the Dust Settles is the second studio album by Juice Newton & Silver Spur was released by RCA Records in 1976. "If I Ever" was the album's debut and only single.

Track listing

Personnel
Juice Newton - vocals, acoustic guitar
Otha Young - vocals, acoustic and electric guitar
Tom Kealey - vocals, bass
Curtis Cloonan - slide guitar
Ed Black - pedal steel guitar
Robbie Gillman - piano, synthesizer
Mickey McGee - drums, percussion, backing vocals
Alan Abrahams - cabasa, percussion
Clarence McDonald - organ, piano
Bones Howe - tambourine, executive producer
Charlie Harwood - piano
Charles Merriam - backing vocals

External links

1976 albums
Juice Newton albums
RCA Records albums